The Italy national rugby sevens team has occasionally competed in the IRB Sevens World Series since the series' was introduced in 1999, although they do not participate in every leg. Their first (and currently only) ever points in the World Series came in 2003, when they scored four points in the Cardiff leg of the series. Italy also competes in the Rugby Europe Sevens Grand Prix Series each summer.

Italy also plays qualifying matches for two quadrennial tournaments—the Rugby World Cup Sevens and the Summer Olympics. Italy has participated in the Sevens World Cup multiple times, but has not qualified for the Olympics.

Tournament history

Rugby World Cup Sevens

Sevens Grand Prix Series

World Rugby Sevens Challenger Series

Current squad
Squad to the 2022 Rugby World Cup Sevens European Qualifier: 

Diego Antl (Valorugby Emilia)
Francesco Bonavolontà (Lazio)
Lorenzo Maria Bruno (Lyons Piacenza)
Massimo Cioffi (Valorugby Emilia)
Francesco Cozzi (Lazio)
Mattia D’Anna (Mogliano)
Matthias Douglas (Valpolicella)
Alessandro Forcucci (Fiamme Oro)
Paul Marie Foroncelli (Rangers Vicenza)
Riccardo Ghelli (Rovigo Delta)
Alessio Guardiano (Fiamme Oro)
Ratko Jelic (Viadana)
Lodovico Manni (Petrarca Padova)
Giovanni Montemauri (Lazio)
Richard Paletta (Valorugby Emilia)
Livio Romano (Capitolina Roma)
Jacopo Salvetti (Lyons Piacenza)
Gianmarco Vian (Fiamme Oro)

See also
Italy national rugby union team
Italy women's national rugby sevens team
Rugby World Cup Sevens
World Rugby Sevens Series
Sevens Grand Prix Series

References

External links
Federazione Italiana Rugby official site

sevens
National rugby sevens teams